A Viking ring fortress, or Trelleborg-type fortress, is a type of circular fort of a special design, built in Scandinavia during the Viking Age. Collectively, they may also be known as trelleborgs. These fortresses have a strictly circular shape, with roads and gates pointing in the four cardinal directions. They are sometimes partially encircled by advanced ramparts, though not always circular.

There are a total of seven known Viking ring fortresses at present, located in Denmark and Scania, Sweden. Many of them have been dated to the reign of Harold Bluetooth of Denmark, c. 980. Their exact purpose is subject to debate.

Etymology
This specific type of fortification was named after the first discovered example: Trelleborg near Slagelse, excavated in the years 1936–1941. Traditionally, the name trelleborg has been translated and explained as ″a fortress built by slaves″, since the Old Norse word for slave was thrall (The modern word is træl in Danish and träl in Swedish) and borg means fortress or city. The word trel (pl. trelle) is also a plausible explanation and relates to the wooden staves, covering both sides of the protective circular walls.

History 
Around 974 the Danish Viking king Harald Bluetooth lost control of the Danevirke and parts of Southern Jutland to the Saxons. The entire complex of fortifications, bridges and roads which were built around 980 are presumed by some to be Harald's work, and part of a larger defensive system. Fortifications of a similar design and date have been found around other old towns in Scandinavia, like in Aarhus for example, but they lack the perfect circular geometry of the distinct ring fortresses. Most of the fortresses have been dated to the reign of Harald Bluetooth, which lasted from c. 958 until 986. The fort in Borgeby, however, has been dated to c. 1000, though as the precise date is undetermined, it is possible that it was also constructed as part of his fortification push.

The precise purpose of the fortresses, however, is unknown. Some historians argue that they functioned as military barracks or training grounds by Sweyn Forkbeard. However, it is more likely that they were intended as defensive strongholds along strategic trade points and/or administrative outposts of the budding state. Soren Sindbæk has offered the hypothesis that the fortresses allowed local populations to seek shelter within the fortress walls against an enemy while waiting for assistance from friendly forces from afar; this means that the fortresses helped Harald Bluetooth to control vast territory and send his army to a particular part of his territory without worrying that the undefended parts would be conquered or plundered. Others have debated whether the fortresses were defensive structures, military strongholds, or primarily served as barracks, as well as the economic, religious, and symbolic significance of the fortresses.

Many of the fortresses were abandoned by the end of the Viking Era. Several were enveloped by other settlements, such as Nonnebakken which now lies underneath Odense, and Trelleborgen under the city of Trelleborg. Others, were forgotten and receded into the landscape. The modern rediscovery of these sites began in the 1930s, with the excavation of Trelleborg. Since then, a total of seven sites have been officially recognised at Viking ring fortresses. A possible eighth site in Helsingborg was suggested in 2009 after archaeological excavations since 1987. The Helsingborg ring fort might have been the largest of them all, at a diameter of 270 m. Another site in Rygge has also been proposed, but not confirmed.

Similar structures have been found throughout Northern Europe, particularly in Ireland, but none of them have the same strict and precise geometrical design of the Scandinavian ring fortresses. On the coasts of the Netherlands and Belgium there are ring castles with certain points of resemblance. On the island Walcheren, for example, there are the remnants of a castle with gateways in the four points of the compass, combined with streets. Similar forts can be found in England, such as Warham Camp. These generally date though from around the time of the Roman conquest of Celtic Britain and had been lying in ruins for hundreds of years prior to the building of the Viking ring forts.

Denmark and Sweden are currently applying for admission of the Viking ring fortresses as UNESCO World Heritage sites.

List of viking ring fortresses
Confirmed
 Aggersborg near Aggersund, Denmark.
 Borgeby north of Lund in Scania, Sweden.
 Borrering near Køge, Denmark.
 Fyrkat near Hobro, Denmark.
 Nonnebakken in Odense, Denmark.
 Trelleborg near Slagelse, Denmark.
 Trelleborgen in Trelleborg, Scania, Sweden.
Suspected

 Helsingborg in Scania, Sweden.
 Rygge in Østfold, Norway.

Comparison of the seven fortifications

The viking ring fortresses differ clearly from others types of fortifications from the Viking Age. Unlike other circular forts from the period, the ring fortresses which follow the Trelleborg model are constructed after a strictly geometrical plan and measured with the Roman foot. The pointed bottoms of the moats is another element borrowed from the Ancient Romans. All of such fortresses had similar designs, "perfectly circular with gates opening to the four corners of the earth, and a courtyard divided into four areas which held large houses set in a square pattern."

Datings by dendrochronology have found the wood used for the construction of Trelleborg to have been felled in the autumn of 980 and thus being used for building presumedly in the spring of 981. The rather short construction time and the complete lack of any signs of maintenance indicate an only short use of the buildings, maybe five years but hardly more than twenty. The others have been dated to roughly the same time. Fyrkat may be a little older, Aggersborg somewhat younger. Not enough has been found at the other sites for a precise dating but the construction and layout of the trelleborgs at Slagelse, Fyrkat, Aggersborg, Nonnebakken under Odense and the fort under modern Trelleborg in Sweden is so similar that it is believed most probable that they were conceived by a single mind.

Gallery

See also 
 Circular rampart
 Ringfort
 Ravning Bridge, a contemporary large-scale structure in Denmark.

References 

Forts in Denmark
Germanic archaeological artifacts
Buildings and structures completed in the 10th century
Viking ring fortresses
10th-century fortifications